Judge Payne may refer to:

Harry Vearle Payne (1908–1983), judge of the United States District Court for the District of New Mexico
James H. Payne (born 1941), judge of the United States District Court for the Eastern, Northern, and Western Districts of Oklahoma
Robert E. Payne (born 1941), judge of the United States District Court for the Eastern District of Virginia
Roy S. Payne (fl. 1970s–2020s), magistrate judge of the United States District Court for the Eastern District of Texas

See also
Justice Paine (disambiguation)